Aubercy is a French company that produces bespoke shoes, high-end ready-to-wear and a shoe repair service. It was founded in 1935 by André and Renée Aubercy, at the 34, Vivienne street, in Paris.

In 2019, Aubercy is still run by the founder's family and is still independent, administrated by Philippe, Odette and their son, Xavier Aubercy.

History 
Aubercy bootmaker was founded in 1935 by André and his wife Renée Aubercy.  The company first only produced high-end ready to wear shoes. The first collections were made in a small workshop in the neighborhood of Buttes-Chaumont. The shoes were designed to match the taste of the high society's member that André Aubercy befriended during the Interwar period, such as Edward VIII, Albert Sarraut and especially the Baron de Redé and Arthuro Lopez. The Baron de Redé and Arthuro Lopez were a critical influence on the development of Aubercy's style.

After World War II, Aubercy Boot-maker became famous for providing shoes to socialites such as Paul Meurice, Sacha Guitry and Jacques Charron.

In the seventies, Philippe and Odette Aubercy inherited the company and developed new products, such as a women's line, multiples leather goods products and a made to order service in which client could personalize all the products.

Nowadays, Aubercy Bootmaker is administrated by Philippe and Odette's son, Xavier Aubercy. Pursuing and reinforcing the handwork and craft identity of the company, he invented numerous high-end ready-to-wear models, opened a bespoke boot-maker workshop, in Paris in early 2000, and a luxury shoe repair service.

Style 
Aubercy style is French and aims to synthesize both English and Italian styles.

Aubercy's style is characterized by many elements usually only used in bespoke boot-making, such as the chiseled toe, the hand sewn midsole, the doubled seam on the upper and hand cutting and hand sewing the shoes.

Award 
In June 2016 the French Ministry of Economic and Finances awarded Aubercy Boot-maker the Entreprise du patrimoine vivant label.

Notes and references 

Shoe brands
Fashion